The 1931–32 Eintracht Frankfurt season was the 32nd season in the club's football history. In 1931–32 the club played in the Bezirksliga Main-Hessen, then one of many top tiers of German football. It was the club's 5th season in the Bezirksliga Main-Hessen.

The season ended up with Eintracht winning the South German championship for the second time, but later losing to Bayern Munich in the final match.

Matches

Legend

Friendlies

Bezirksliga Main-Hessen

League fixtures and results

League table

South German Championship round, North West division

Fixtures and results

South German Championship final match

German Championship knockout stage

Final

Squad

Squad and statistics

|}

Transfers

In:

Out:

Notes

See also
 1932 German football championship

Sources

External links
 Official English Eintracht website 
 German archive site

1931-32
German football clubs 1931–32 season